Saikyo Dam  is a rockfill dam located in Kagoshima Prefecture in Japan. The dam is used for irrigation and water supply. The catchment area of the dam is 4.2 km2. The dam impounds about 26  ha of land when full and can store 2301 thousand cubic meters of water. The construction of the dam was started on 1979 and completed in 1987.

See also
List of dams in Japan

References

Dams in Kagoshima Prefecture